The Korisliiga 2011-2012 regular season started in September 2011. Nilan Bisons Loimaa eventually won its first national championship, by beating Joensuun Kataja 3–1 in the Finals.

Participants 
Joensuun Kataja
Kauhajoen Karhu
Kouvot
KTP-Basket
Lappeenrannan NMKY
Namika Lahti
Nilan Bisons
Salon Vilpas
Tampereen Pyrintö
Torpan Pojat
UU-Korihait

Regular season

Playoffs

External links 
 Korisliiga

Korisliiga seasons
Finnish
Koris